is a town located in Nagano Prefecture, Japan. , the town had an estimated population of 11,045 in 4892 households, and a population density of 23 persons per km². Kiso Town is listed as one of The Most Beautiful Villages in Japan.

Geography
Kiso is located in mountainous southwest Nagano Prefecture, bordered by Gifu Prefecture to the west.

Surrounding municipalities
Nagano Prefecture
 Matsumoto
 Shiojiri
 Ina
 Agematsu
 Kiso (village)
 Ōtaki
 Miyada
Gifu Prefecture
Takayama
Gero

Climate
The town has a climate characterized by characterized by warm and humid summers, and cold winters with heavy snowfall (Köppen climate classification Dfb).

History
The area of present-day Kiso was part of ancient Shinano Province.

The modern town was created through a merger of the town of Kiso-Fukushima with the villages of Hiyoshi, Kaida and Mitake on November 1, 2005.

Demographics
Per Japanese census data, the population of Kiso has decreased rapidly over the past 60 years and is now less than half what it was in 1940.

Education
Kiso has four public elementary schools and three public middle schools operated by the town government, and one high school operated the Nagano Prefectural Board of Education. The prefectural also operates a special education school. The Solar-Terrestrial Environment Laboratory, Nagoya University is located in Kiso.

Transportation

Railway
 JR Tōkai – Chūō Main Line
 -  -

Highway

Local attractions
 Mount Ontake

References

External links

Official Website 

 
Towns in Nagano Prefecture